The Christie suspension is a suspension system developed by American engineer J. Walter Christie for his tank designs. It allowed considerably longer movement than conventional leaf spring systems then in common use, which allowed his tanks to have considerably greater cross-country speed. The system was first introduced on his M1928 design, and used on all of his designs until his death in 1944.

History 

Christie advocated the use of lightweight tanks with long range and high speed, designed to penetrate enemy lines and attack their infrastructure and logistics capabilities.

A major problem with tanks in World War I was tracked suspension failure.  Christie's first tank design of 1919 could be driven on its wheels to get to the starting point and then the tracks fitted before it went into action.  The US Tank Corps ordered a single tank from Christie's company based on this design.  The tank, known as the M1919, was delivered in early 1921 and tested until Christie proposed modifying it. The modifications added coil suspension to the front wheels and removed the turret - the armament being moved to the nose of the vehicle. The tank - now known as M1921 - was tested in 1922 and 1923 but considered lacking in maneuverability and internal space and so put into the Ordnance Museum at Aberdeen Proving Ground in 1924.

His earlier designs in the 1920s were hampered by poor cross-country performance due to limited suspension capability. The major problem he faced was the limited vertical space for springs to move in: for a 25 cm movement it might need 50 or 75 cm of vertical space for the spring and strut, and his small designs did not offer such space.

In the late 1920s he devised a better solution. The solution was the addition of a bellcrank, which changed the direction of motion from vertical to horizontal. The road wheels were individually mounted on a pipe that could move vertically only, at the top of which the bell crank rotated the direction of motion to the rear. Springs were mounted on the end of the crank, and could be as long as needed, lying along the inside of the hull. The result was a substantial increase in range of motion, from only some 10 cm in his original designs, to 25 cm on the M1928, 35 cm on the M1930, and 60 cm on the M1932.

The four sprung road wheels could move 11 inches on top of the "compression due to the weight of the vehicle". Although there was interest by the Army in the design, negotiations over the requirements were drawn out and a single Christie M1931 was delivered in March 1931 followed by an order for 7 more in June. These received official designation as "Convertible Medium Tank T3" and all seven were delivered by 1932. Four were given to the cavalry for testing. They had the main gun replaced with a heavy machine gun and were renamed "Combat Car T1". The crew of two and relatively light armour was insufficient for the infantry support function the tank was expected to have. The Army drew up a specification for an improved T3 but following disputes with Christie the order - for 5 of the "Convertible Medium Tank T3E2" was given to the American-La France company.

The most famous Christie-based tanks, the Soviet BT tank series and the T-34, used coil springs mounted vertically (on the BT) or at a slight angle from vertical (the T-34).

Another feature of Christie's designs was the "convertible" drive: the ability to remove the tracks for road travel, allowing for higher speeds and better range, and reducing wear on the fragile caterpillar track systems of the 1930s. In one public test 1931 in Linden, NJ, Army officials clocked a Christie M1931 tank attaining , making it the fastest tank in the world: a record many believe it still holds. There were no return rollers for the upper track run; the tracks were supported by the road wheels. As with many track designs with center guide teeth, dual wheels were used, allowing the guide teeth to run between them.

Because large road wheels and "slack track" are characteristic of the Christie suspension, other designs with these features are sometimes misidentified as such. The real Christie suspension was used only on a few designs, notably the Soviet BT tanks and T-34, the British Cruiser tanks, including the A13s: Cruiser Mk III, Cruiser Mk IV, Covenanter, Crusader, Cromwell and the Comet, as well as some experimental Polish and Italian designs. Post-T-34 Soviet tanks, while remaining outwardly similar, have actually used torsion bar suspension, as did the German tanks with Heinrich Kniepkamp and Ernst Lehr's Schachtellaufwerke (interlaced running gear) suspension.

Later wartime developments simplified the suspension. By 1939, the Soviets found that the BT tank's convertible drive was an unnecessary complication which occupied valuable space in the tank, and the feature was dropped in the T-34. The original Christie suspension used large rubber-rimmed road wheels but wartime rubber shortages forced some T-34 factories to use wheels with sprung steel rims to be used instead.  Most T-34s, however, continued to be built with rubber-rimmed tires.

See also 

 Horstmann suspension
 History of the tank
 G-numbers
 Tank classification

References

External links
Christies US1836446A 1931 Patent Documentation
British Pathe newsreel footage of Christie suspension tank 
 Christie Tanks
The Russian Battlefield: Christie Tank in the USSR 
Christie M1932 T3 tank photos @ 5 Star General site

Bibliography
 
 
 

1920s introductions
1920s in transport
Armoured fighting vehicle equipment
Automotive suspension technologies
Tank suspensions